The scaly boy (Aboma etheostoma) is a species of goby native to the Pacific coast of Central America from Mexico to Panama.  This species is the only known member of its genus.

Description
It has notably large eyes and a small mouth, as well as being mottled light brown in color.

Habitat 
This species is demersal, inhabiting shallow estuaries with a substrate of mud and sand to a depth of 8 m. This habitat is likely to be impacted by the expansion of shrimp farming and aquaculture, but data to assess the effects of habitat loss on the scaly boy are currently lacking.

References

Gobiidae

Fish described in 1895
Taxa named by David Starr Jordan